This is a list of wars involving Rwanda since its independence from Belgium in 1962.

Notes 

Rwanda

Wars